Lake of Fire is a 2006 American documentary film directed by Tony Kaye that graphically depicts abortion in the United States. It features Noam Chomsky, Peter Singer, Alan Dershowitz, Nat Hentoff, Randall Terry and Norma McCorvey, among others. Footage of Paul Jennings Hill, who murdered physician Dr. John Britton and Britton's bodyguard James Barrett in 1994, was also featured.

The documentary was filmed entirely in black and white. It opened in September 2006 in Toronto, Ontario.

Critical reception

On Rotten Tomatoes, the film has a 94% score based on 54 reviews with an average rating of 7.8/10. The site's critical consensus reads "Lake of Fires engaging interviews and powerful black-and-white visuals make for a riveting and honest documentary about a very controversial topic". Additionally, the film also holds an 83/100 score (indicating "universal acclaim") on Metacritic based on 15 reviews. The site also gave it a "Metacritic Must-See" award.

On November 19, 2007, Lake of Fire was named by the Academy of Motion Picture Arts and Sciences as one of 15 films on its documentary feature Oscar shortlist, but it did not receive a nomination.

Top ten lists
The film appeared on several critics' top ten lists of the best films of 2007.

3rd – Scott Foundas, LA Weekly (tied with 4 Months, 3 Weeks and 2 Days)
4th – Joshua Rothkopf, Time Out New York
4th – Ella Taylor, LA Weekly (tied with 4 Months, 3 Weeks and 2 Days)
6th – Scott Tobias, The A.V. Club
10th – Ty Burr, The Boston Globe

See also
Abortion debate
Anti-abortion violence
Abortion law
Abortion in the United States
Religion and abortion
List of films shot over three or more years

References

External links

2006 films
2006 documentary films
Documentary films about abortion
American documentary films
Films directed by Tony Kaye (director)
American black-and-white films
Films scored by Anne Dudley
Abortion in the United States
2000s English-language films
2000s American films
English-language documentary films